Jebel Boukornine (jebel bū-qarnīn), also spelled Djebel Bou Kornine or Mount Bou Kornine, is a 576-meter mountain in northern Tunisia, overlooking the Gulf of Tunis and Hammam Lif city. 

It consists of folded and faulted outcrops of Jurassic limestone. 

Its name "bou kornine" comes from Tunisian Arabic meaning "the one with two horns", originally from the punic language as "ba'al kornine", meaning "lord with two horns". It owes its name to the two highlights of altitude 576 and 493 meters at the top. 
During the times of ancient Carthage, the mountain was considered sacred and religious rituals were conducted there.

The massif is part of Boukornine National Park, covering area of 1939 ha and protecting many species of plants and animals. The mountain slopes are covered with Aleppo pine and cedar.

Djebel Ressas about 30 km to the southwest is a taller peak at 795 m.

References

Boukornine